Latvian Shipping Company is a Latvian shipping company founded 29 October 1940 and listed on the NASDAQ OMX Riga.  The company owns 20 ships, employing more than 700 seamen from Latvia. The total carrying capacity of the LK fleet is 957 974 DWT and the average age of the fleet does not exceed 6.5 years. 
Main shareholder is Ventspils Nafta (49.94%).

History 

 In 2004, the privatization of the company was completed, and Ventspils Nafta became the largest shareholder.
 In 2016, Latvian shipping operated with a loss of 21.156 million euros. In June 2017, Latvian Shipping's subsidiary SIA LASCO Investment sold the Preses nams building to SIA PN Project, which is managed by the Lithuanian real estate and private equity company Lords LB Asset Management.
 In 2017, turnover of the company decreased by 9.1%, profit was 11.273 million euros.
 In February 2018, SIA LSC Shipmanagement, a subsidiary of Latvian Shipping Company, which performed technical supervision of tankers, was renamed SIA LSC. In May 2018, the subsidiary company of Latvian Shipping Company SIA LASCO Investment became the property of Ventspils nafta. On June 20, Vitol Netherlands B.V. became the owner of SIA LSC. In May 2018, the subsidiary company of Latvian Shipping Company SIA LASCO Investment became the property of Ventspils nafta. On June 20, Vitol Netherlands B.V. became the owner of SIA LSC.

References 

Shipping companies of Latvia
Companies based in Riga
Transport companies established in 1940
1940 establishments in Latvia
Shipping companies of the Soviet Union